Dunbar is a surname. Notable people with the surname include:

Earls of Dunbar 
Patrick I, Earl of Dunbar (5th Earl of Dunbar) (died 1232)
Patrick II, Earl of Dunbar (6th Earl of Dunbar) (died 1248)
Patrick III, Earl of Dunbar (7th Earl of Dunbar) (1213–1289)
Patrick IV, Earl of March (8th Earl of Dunbar) (1242–1308)
Patrick V, Earl of March (9th Earl of Dunbar) (1284–1368)
Agnes Dunbar, 4th Countess of Moray, wife of the above
George de Dunbar, 10th Earl of March (10th Earl of Dunbar) (1340–1420)
George de Dunbar, 11th Earl of March (11th Earl of Dunbar) (c. 1370–1457)

Other 
 Adrian Dunbar (born 1958), Northern Irish actor
 Alice Dunbar-Nelson (1875–1935), American poet, journalist, and political activist
 Aynsley Dunbar (born 1946), English musician
 Bobby Dunbar, child who disappeared in 1912
 Bonnie J. Dunbar (born 1949), American astronaut
 Bonnie S. Dunbar(born 1948), vaccine developer
 Carl Owen Dunbar (1891–1979), American paleontologist
 Charles Davidson Dunbar (1870–1939), pipe major
 Charles Franklin Dunbar (1830–1900), American economist
 Council Julian Dunbar Jr. (1922–2020), American politician
 Cyrus Dunbar (1856–1920), Washington state pioneer and businessman 
 David Dunbar (disambiguation)
 Donald Dunbar, American poet
 Donald P. Dunbar
 Dorothy Dunbar
 Emmons Dunbar
 Erica Armstrong Dunbar, American historian
 Evelyn Dunbar (1906-1960), British artist
 Forrest Dunbar (born 1984), American politician and attorney
 Gavin Dunbar (disambiguation)
 Gavin Dunbar (archbishop)
 George Dunbar (disambiguation)
 Helen Flanders Dunbar (1902–1959), psychiatrist and psychobiologist
 Jackie Dunbar, Scottish politician
 James Dunbar (disambiguation)
 James Dunbar-Nasmith
 Jennifer Dunbar Dorn
 Jesse Dunbar
 Jim Dunbar
 John Dunbar (disambiguation)
 Jubilee Dunbar (born 1949), American football player
 Karen Dunbar, Scottish comedian
 Lance Dunbar, American football player
 Michael Dunbar, Scottish footballer
 Mike Dunbar, American football coach
 Moira Dunbar (1918–1999), Scottish-Canadian glaciologist 
 Nan Dunbar (1928-2005), Fellow and Tutor in Classics at Somerville College, Oxford
 Paul Laurence Dunbar (1872–1906), American poet
 Robin Dunbar, anthropologist and evolutionary biologist
 Roberta Dunbar (d. 1956), American club woman and peace activist
 Rockmond Dunbar
 Ron Dunbar, songwriter and record producer
 Roxanne Dunbar-Ortiz
 R. Scott Dunbar
 Rudolph Dunbar (1907–1988), Guyanese conductor, clarinetist and composer
 Sly Dunbar (born 1952), Jamaican musician
 Steven Dunbar Jr. (born 1995), American football player
 Susan Ames Dunbar
 Tom Dunbar
 Vaughn Dunbar
 Vicki Nelson-Dunbar
 William Dunbar, medieval Scottish poet
 William Dunbar, 7th Baronet
 William Dunbar (Louisiana), congressman from Louisiana
 William F. Dunbar first Minnesota State Auditor
 William P. Dunbar (1863–1922), American physician in Germany
 William Dunbar (explorer) (1750–1810), American merchant, naturalist, astronomer and explorer

Fictional characters 
 Dunbar, a character in the novel Catch-22
 First Lieutenant John J. Dunbar, the protagonist/narrator of Dances with Wolves
 Heather Dunbar, erstwhile Solicitor General and 2016 Democratic Primary challenger to President Frank Underwood.
 Russell Dunbar, a character in Rules of Engagement (TV series)
 Zeke Jedediah Dunbar, the protagonist's sidekick in the 2009 PlayStation 3 video game Infamous
 William Dunbar, a recurring character in Code Lyoko who becomes a main character in Code Lyoko: Evolution.
 Daniel Dunbar, also known as Dan the Dyna-Mite, from The Young All-Stars